The Rheider Au is a river of Schleswig-Holstein, Germany.

The Rheider Au is a tributary of the Treene near Hollingstedt. Its source is on the Geest near Schleswig. In the Viking Age the route Eider - Treene - Rheider Au - Schlei served as a navigation way and/or transport or trade route between places to the north and the Baltic Sea, as commercial centres functioned (see Dorestad, Haithabu).

See also
List of rivers of Schleswig-Holstein

Rivers of Schleswig-Holstein
Rivers of Germany